Manitoba Colony is a large community of Plautdietch-speaking Mennonites mostly north of Ciudad Cuauhtémoc in the state of Chihuahua in Mexico. It was founded in 1922 by Old Colony Mennonites from Manitoba, Canada and consisted originally of 47 villages. It is the largest and oldest Mennonite colony in Mexico.

In 1926 the Manitoba settlement consisted of 3,340 persons, in 1949 the number had grown to 7,706, and in 1953 the number was 8,768. In 1987 the total population of the Manitoba settlement was around 12,500 persons and 17,000 in 2006.

Adjacent to Manitoba Colony is Swift Current Colony. Further to the north are the Ojo de la Yegua Colony (Nordkolonie), Santa Rita Colony, and Santa Clara Colony. West of Santa Rita Colony is Los Jagueyes Colony (Quellenkolonie). Altogether these Mennonite colonies stretch over 100 km and have some 50,000 Mennonite residents (2015).

References 

Canadian diaspora in Mexico
Old Colony Mennonites
Russian Mennonite diaspora in Mexico